The 2017–18 Liga Alef season was the 9th season as third tier since its re-alignment in 2009 and the 76th season of third-tier football in Israel.

Changes from last season

Team changes
 Hapoel Hadera and Hapoel Marmorek were promoted to Liga Leumit; Hapoel Jerusalem (to North division) and Maccabi Sha'arayim (to South division) were relegated from Liga Leumit.
 F.C. Tzeirei Kafr Kanna were relegated to Liga Bet from North division, along with F.C. Karmiel Safed, who folded during the season.   The two clubs were replaced by Hapoel Shefa-'Amr and Hapoel Umm al-Fahm , which were promoted to the North division from Liga Bet.
 F.C. Bnei Jaffa Ortodoxim and F.C. Shikun HaMizrah were relegated to Liga Bet from South division and were replaced by Hapoel Tzafririm Holon Yaniv and Nordia Jerusalem which were promoted to the South division from Liga Bet. During the summer, the merge between Hapoel Holon Yaniv and Hapoel Tzafririm Holon collapsed, leading Tzafririm Holon to re-register to Liga Gimel, while Hapoel Holon took the merged club's place in Liga Alef, playing under the name F.C. Holon Yermiyahu.

North Division

Results

Positions by round
The table lists the positions of teams after each week of matches. In order to preserve chronological evolvements, any postponed matches are not included to the round at which they were originally scheduled, but added to the full round they were played immediately afterwards. For example, if a match is scheduled for matchday 13, but then postponed and played between days 16 and 17, it will be added to the standings for day 17.

South Division

Results

Positions by round
The table lists the positions of teams after each week of matches. In order to preserve chronological evolvements, any postponed matches are not included to the round at which they were originally scheduled, but added to the full round they were played immediately afterwards. For example, if a match is scheduled for matchday 13, but then postponed and played between days 16 and 17, it will be added to the standings for day 17.

Promotion play-offs

Test matches

Hapoel Kfar Saba won 5–3 on aggregate and remained in Liga Leumit. Ironi Tiberias remained in Liga Alef.

Relegation play-offs

North division

South division

References

External links 
Liga Alef North 2017/2018 The Israel Football Association 
Liga Alef South 2017/2018 The Israel Football Association 

3
Liga Alef seasons
Israel Liga Alef